Hanne Bramness (born 3 April 1959) is a Norwegian poet and translator. She made her literary debut in 1983 with the poetry collection Korrespondanse. Other collections are I sin tid from 1986, Nattens kontinent from 1992, and Revolusjonselegier from 1996. She has translated English, Chinese and Japanese poetry into Norwegian language. She was awarded the Dobloug Prize in 2006.

References 

1959 births
Living people
Norwegian women poets
20th-century Norwegian poets
20th-century Norwegian translators
20th-century Norwegian women writers
Translators to Norwegian
Dobloug Prize winners